Christopher Butler was a private investigator, and former Antioch, California police officer, who founded a firm named Private Investigations, Inc., based in Concord, California.

P.I. Moms
Butler used the name P.I. Moms to identify and promote his use of women investigators to land a reality show based on his business.

Arrest
Butler was arrested on February 16, 2011 along with Central Contra Costa County California Narcotic Enforcement Team Commander Norman Wielsch. The two men were accused of selling police-confiscated crystal methamphetamine, anabolic steroids, and marijuana. These items had been seized as evidence in unrelated investigations and arrests. The materials had been stolen from police evidence lockers. Both men were indicted on 28 felony counts.

The counts include embezzlement, second-degree burglary and conspiracy, as well as the drug-related charges. Butler's bail was set at $840,000, and Wielsch's was set at $660,000. Upon arrest, both were held in the Contra Costa county jail, located in Martinez, California. On February 8, 2012, the Contra Costa County District Attorney's Office dropped all state charges against Butler while a case against him continued at the federal level.  In May 2012, Butler pleaded guilty to robbery, extortion, and conspiracy, and in September 2012 he was sentenced to eight years in prison.

Dirty DUIs
As recorded in published transcripts of his interviews with police detectives on March 17, 2011, Butler admitted that he hired female decoys to assist in determining if a "target" male, usually the husband of his female client, would drink alcohol in a quantity sufficient to exceed the legal limit to drive an automobile. Once the "target" male had been observed to consume this amount of alcohol likely to exceed the legal limit to drive, the hired female decoys would leave the establishment and ask the target to follow them home.

An associate coined the phrase "dirty DUI scheme" to describe the practice. A number of the arrests and convictions resulting from the practice have been expunged and overturned, along with apologies from the senior deputy district attorney of Contra Costa County, Hal Jewett, whose office prosecuted the original cases. Jewett was quoted in his cover letter to one man arrested in a Butler "sting" operation as saying the drunken driving arrest was "one of the most deplorable legal practices I have ever heard of."

Media coverage
Butler's organization was featured in the media. Using these media appearances as marketing and with the help of a Beverly Hills public relations company, Butler signed a contract to be part of a reality television show on Lifetime Television. Prior to the filming of the reality show, Butler was contacted by the local pop culture periodical Diablo Magazine in an effort to appeal to the demographic that the magazine served. As admitted by several participants in the actions, Butler re-enacted a case to satisfy the "ride along" demand of the magazine's reporter, Peter Crooks. The re-enactment was executed on September 11, 2010, including a convoluted journey into the Napa Valley wine country tailing a suspected cheating fiancé and his mistress. The "PIs" involved were also all in on the ruse. Crooks was easily fooled; he was convinced that his experience was real and went on to write the story. Calling himself "Ronald Rutherford", Carl Marino told Crooks that the entire case had been a re-enactment. In several subsequent emails from "Rutherford", Carl Marino laid out carefully crafted evidence for the reporter to show that he was trustworthy and that the information was valid. Carl Marino told Crooks that he was informing him as a favor so that the magazine could avoid embarrassment. After Crooks received the e-mail from Marino, he immediately contacted Butler and the "PI Moms" who had been on the ride along to question them about it.

References

External links
 
 Federal Bureau of Prisons inmate locator

American people convicted of drug offenses
Living people
Place of birth missing (living people)
People from Concord, California
Private detectives and investigators
Year of birth missing (living people)